The Allegheny Valley School District is a small, suburban, public school district located in Allegheny County, Pennsylvania. It covers Cheswick and Springdale boroughs and Harmar and Springdale townships in Allegheny County, Pennsylvania. According to 2000 federal census data, it serves a resident population of 10,771 people. In 2009, the district residents’ per capita income was $22,071, while the median family income was $45,562. In the Commonwealth, the median family income was $49,501 and the United States median family income was $49,445, in 2010.

Schools
Acmetonia Elementary School (grades K–6)
Springdale Junior-Senior High School (grades 7–12)

References

External links
Allegheny Valley School District website

School districts in Allegheny County, Pennsylvania
Education in Pittsburgh area
School districts established in 1965